Founded in 1875, the Buffalo Zoo, located at 300 Parkside Ave in Buffalo, New York, is the seventh oldest zoo in the United States. Each year, the Buffalo Zoo welcomes approximately 400,000 visitors and is the second largest tourist attraction in Western New York; second only to Niagara Falls. The zoo is open year-round.

History

The zoo traces its history to the mid-19th century when Jacob E. Bergtold, a Buffalo furrier, presented a pair of deer to the city of Buffalo. To provide the deer with room to graze, Elam R. Jewett, the publisher of the Buffalo Daily Journal, offered to house the deer on his estate.  Simultaneously, plans were being made for the municipal North Park (today's Delaware Park), and Mayor William F. Rogers hired landscape architect, Frederick Law Olmsted, to include a zoo as part of the park's design. Five years after, the deer were donated, more animals were added to the collection, and the first permanent building was erected, signifying the establishment of the Buffalo Zoological Gardens in 1875.

The zoo underwent a large expansion during the Great Depression and became a major work site for the Works Progress Administration. Among the new structures was the Buffalo Zoo Entrance Court at Parkside Avenue and Amherst Street.  It was designed by African-American architect John Edmonston Brent (son of architect Calvin Brent) and built 1935–1938. The Buffalo Zoo Entrance Court was listed on the National Register of Historic Places in 2013.

Throughout the next several decades, more exhibits and facilities were added, including the Reptile House (1942), Children's Zoo (1965), Giraffe House and Veterinary Hospital (1967), and The Gorilla Habitat Building (1981). The zoo's mission also began to change during the 1980s and 1990s under the direction of Minot Ortolani, as it began reducing the numbers of animals in its collection to focus on the breeding of endangered species that might not otherwise have a chance at survival. In addition to its conservation efforts, the zoo also placed more of an emphasis on education to teach visitors about the animals and their natural habitats. From 2000 - 2017 the President/CEO of the zoo was Dr Donna M. Fernandes, with Norah B. Fletchall succeeding her in 2017.

In 2002, a 15-year master plan was unveiled to transform the zoo. New visitor amenities and naturalistic habitats were planned, including the Asian River and Highlands Zone, African Watering Hole, Arctic Edge, and the Wonders of Water Children's Zoo. Phase One of the Master Plan has resulted in the opening of the Vanishing Animals exhibit, EcoStation, Otter Creek, and Sea Lion Cove. The completion of Phase One was marked by the September 10, 2008, opening of the South American Rainforest, a four-season attraction that features a two-story waterfall, dozens of colorful birds, and a variety of other rainforest species. In the fall of 2015 the $14 million Arctic Edge opened to the public featuring Arctic wolves, lynxes and polar bears. In 2016 the Arctic wolves were replaced by Arctic foxes which fit the size of the exhibit better than the wolves. Arctic Edge is currently home to two polar bears Anana and Luna. Luna is the offspring of Anana and Nanuq, who now resides at the Columbus Zoo.

In March 2018, the zoo's Reptile House was closed for 14 months to undergo a $3.7 million remodel. It reopened on May 24, 2019 as the Donna M. Fernandes Amphibian and Reptile Center with a new roof, refreshed exhibits, interactive graphics and a conservation room.

In August 2018, the zoo announced it would be sending its two Asian elephants, Jothi and Surapa to the Audubon Zoo in New Orleans due to being unable to care for them anymore. They arrived at the Audubon Zoo later that year. As of 2022, the former elephant habitat is currently occupied by black rhinos.

In early June of 2020, a red-footed tortoise was reportedly stolen from the zoo. There was an ongoing police search, but the tortoise, 'Red', was never found.

Animals

Mammals

Addax
African lion
American bison
American Milking Devon cow
Arctic fox
Axis deer
Babydoll Southdown sheep
Bennett's wallaby
Black howler monkey
Black-capped squirrel monkey
Brown capuchin
California sea lion
Capybara
Common squirrel monkey
Common vampire bat
Desert cottontail
Eastern black rhinoceros
Ferret

Gemsbok
Giant anteater
Golden lion tamarin
Indian rhinoceros
Japanese macaque
Lesser hedgehog tenrec
Linnaeus's two-toed sloth
Long-tailed chinchilla
Maned wolf
Meerkat
Mule
North American porcupine
North American river otter
Ocelot
Plains zebra
Polar bear
Reindeer

Red panda
Red-rumped agouti
Ring-tailed lemur
Roan antelope
Rock hyrax
Rocky Mountain bighorn sheep
Snow leopard
Southern three-banded armadillo
Spotted hyena    
Siberian tiger
Tammar wallaby
Western lowland gorilla
White-faced saki

Birds

American kestrel
Bald eagle
Black vulture
Black-crowned night heron
Blue-crowned motmot
Boat-billed heron
Bourke's parrot
Call duck
Cinereous vulture
Cloncurry parrot

Dominique chicken. 
Eastern rosella
Eastern screech owl
Great horned owl
Green-backed trogon
Green-winged macaw
Lady Ross' turaco
Laughing kookaburra
Mandarin duck
Narragansett turkey

Princess parrot
Roseate spoonbill
Turtle dove
Scarlet ibis
Scarlet macaw
Senegal parrot
Sun conure
Sunbittern
Trumpeter hornbill
Western cattle egret
Yellow-crowned night heron

Reptiles

Annam leaf turtle
Arrau turtle
Ball python
Black tree monitor
Brazilian rainbow boa
Carpet python
Chinese crocodile lizard
Chinese three-striped box turtle
Chuckwalla
Cuvier's dwarf caiman
Desert grassland whiptail lizard
Desert tortoise
Dumeril's monitor
Eastern box turtle
Eastern diamondback rattlesnake
Eastern indigo snake
Gila monster

Gopher tortoise
Green anaconda
Hermann's tortoise
Indochinese box turtle
Jamaican boa
King cobra
Komodo dragon
Leopard gecko
Mangrove snake
Massasauga
Mata mata
Mexican beaded lizard
Mexican lance-headed rattlesnake
Northern blue-tongued skink
Pancake tortoise
Prehensile-tailed skink
Pueblan milk snake

Red-footed tortoise
Reticulated python
Sheltopusik
Sidewinder
Spotted turtle
Tentacled snake
Virgin Islands boa
Yellow-spotted river turtle

Amphibians
Anderson's crocodile newt
Axolotl
Cane toad
Dyeing poison frog
Green and black poison dart frog
Hellbender
Mission golden-eyed tree frog
Panamanian golden frog
Puerto Rican crested toad
Solomon Islands leaf frog
Yellow-banded poison dart frog

Fish
Cichlids
Common pleco
Magdalena River stingray
Ocellate river stingray
Silver dollar fish
Spotted Rafael catfish

Invertebrates
Brazilian cockroach
Brazilian greysmoke spider
Chaco goldenknee tarantula
Chilean rose tarantula

Gallery

References

External links

 $400,000 Grant Boosts New Children’s Zoo
 Renovations Secure Zoo’s Accreditation
On the Hunt For ‘Allegheny Alligators’
Changes at Zoo Make For Happier Animals and Happier People
Buffalo Zoo Welcomes A New Visitor: The Crane

Zoos in New York (state)
Culture of Buffalo, New York
Economy of Buffalo, New York
Tourist attractions in Buffalo, New York
Works Progress Administration in New York (state)
Buildings and structures in Buffalo, New York
Buildings and structures completed in 1938
Buildings and structures on the National Register of Historic Places in New York (state)
Zoos established in 1875
1875 establishments in New York (state)
National Register of Historic Places in Buffalo, New York